In Greek mythology and Roman mythology, a harpy (plural harpies,) is a half-human and half-bird personification of storm winds. They feature in Homeric poems.

Descriptions
Harpies were generally depicted as birds with the heads of maidens, faces pale with hunger and long claws on their hands. Roman and Byzantine writers detailed their ugliness. Pottery art depicting the harpies featured beautiful women with wings. Ovid described them as human-vultures.

Hesiod
To Hesiod, they were imagined as fair-locked and winged maidens, who flew as fast as the wind:

Aeschylus
Even as early as the time of Aeschylus, harpies were described as ugly creatures with wings, and later writers carried their notions of the harpies so far as to represent them as most disgusting monsters. The Pythian priestess of Apollo recounted the appearance of the harpies in the following lines:

Virgil

Hyginus

Functions and abodes

The harpies seem originally to have been wind spirits (personifications of the destructive nature of wind). Their name means 'snatchers' or 'swift robbers', and they were said to steal food from their victims while they were eating and carry evildoers (especially those who have killed their families) to the Erinyes. When a person suddenly disappeared from the Earth, it was said that he had been carried off by the harpies. Thus, they carried off the daughters of King Pandareus and gave them as servants to the Erinyes. In this form they were agents of punishment who abducted people and tortured them on their way to Tartarus. They were depicted as vicious, cruel, and violent.

The harpies were called "the hounds of mighty Zeus" thus "ministers of the Thunderer (Zeus)". Later writers listed the harpies among the guardians of the underworld among other monstrosities including the Centaurs, Scylla, Briareus, Lernaean Hydra, Chimera, Gorgons and Geryon.

Their abode was described as either the islands called Strofades, a place at the entrance of Orcus, or a cave in Crete.

Names and family
Hesiod calls them two "lovely-haired" creatures, the daughters of Thaumas and the Oceanid Electra and sisters of Iris. Hyginus, however, cited a certain Ozomene as the mother of the harpies but he also recounted that Electra was also the mother of these beings in the same source. This can be explained by the fact that Ozomene was another name for Electra. The harpies possibly were siblings of the river-god Hydaspes and Arke, as they were called sisters of Iris and children of Thaumas. According to Valerius, Typhoeus (Typhon) was said to be the father of these monsters while a different version by Servius told that the harpies were daughters of Pontus and Gaea or of Poseidon.

They are named Aello ("storm swift") and Ocypete ("the swift wing"), and Virgil added Celaeno ("the dark") as a third. Homer knew of a harpy named Podarge ("fleet-foot"). Aello is sometimes also spelled Aellopus or Nicothoe; Ocypete is sometimes also spelled Ocythoe or Ocypode.

Homer called the harpy Podarge as the mother of the two horses (Balius and Xanthus) of Achilles sired by the West Wind Zephyrus while according to Nonnus, Xanthus and Podarkes, horses of the Athenian king Erechtheus, were born to Aello and the North Wind Boreas. Other progeny of Podarge were Phlogeus and Harpagos, horses given by Hermes to the Dioscuri, who competed for the chariot-race in celebration of the funeral games of Pelias. The swift horse Arion was also said to begotten by loud-piping Zephyrus on a harpy (probably Podarge), as attested by Quintus Smyrnaeus.

Mythology

The most celebrated story in which the harpies play a part is that of King Phineus of Thrace, who was given the gift of prophecy by Zeus. Angry that Phineus gave away the god's secret plan, Zeus punished him by blinding him and putting him on an island with a buffet of food which he could never eat because the harpies always arrived to steal the food out of his hands before he could satisfy his hunger. Later writers add that they either devoured the food themselves, or that they dirtied it by dropping upon it some stinking substance, so as to render it unfit to be eaten.

This continued until the arrival of Jason and the Argonauts. Phineus promised to instruct them respecting the course they had to take, if they would deliver him from the harpies. The Boreads, sons of Boreas, the North Wind, who also could fly, succeeded in driving off the harpies. According to an ancient oracle, the harpies were to perish by the hands of the Boreades, but the Boreades were to die if they could not overtake the harpies. The harpies fled, but one fell into the river Tigris, which was hence called Harpys, and the other reached the Echinades, and as she never returned, the islands were called Strophades. But being worn out with fatigue, she fell down simultaneously with her pursuer; and, as they promised no further to molest Phineus, the two harpies were not deprived of their lives. According to others, the Boreades were on the point of killing the harpies, when Iris or Hermes appeared and commanded the conquerors to set them free, promising that Phineus would not be bothered by the harpies again.  "The dogs of great Zeus" then returned to their "cave in Minoan Crete". Other accounts said that both the harpies as well as the Boreades died. Thankful for their help, Phineus told the Argonauts how to pass the Symplegades.

Tzetzes explained the origin of the myth pertaining to Phineus, the harpies, and the Boreades in his account. In this late version of the myth it was said that Phineus, due to his old age, became blind, and he has two daughters named Eraseia and Harpyreia. These maidens lived a very libertine and lazy life, abandoning themselves to poverty and fatal famine. Then Zetes and Calais snatched them away somehow, and they disappeared from those places ever since. From this account all myths about them [i.e., the harpies] started, as was also retold by Apollonius in his own story of the Argonauts.

Aeneid
Aeneas encountered harpies on the Strophades as they repeatedly made off with the feast the Trojans were setting. Celaeno utters a prophecy: the Trojans will be so hungry they will eat their tables before they reach the end of their journey. The Trojans fled in fear.

Later usage

Literature
Harpies remained vivid in the Middle Ages. In Canto XIII of his Inferno, Dante Alighieri envisages the tortured wood infested with harpies, where the suicides have their punishment in the seventh ring of Hell:

In Canto XXXIII of Orlando Furioso, author Ludovico Ariosto has the Christian Ethiopian Emperor Senapo (Prester John) afflicted with harpies under circumstances nearly identical to those in the myth of Phineus. He has been blinded by the God himself, and the harpies contaminate his every meal. Senapo is delivered from this torment by Astolfo, a paladin from the court of Charlemagne. 

William Blake was inspired by Dante's description in his pencil, ink, and watercolour The Wood of the Self-Murderers: The Harpies and the Suicides (Tate Gallery, London).

Harpies also found a role in Shakespeare's Tempest, where the spirit Ariel tortured the antagonists Antonio, Sebastian, and Alonso for their crimes by staging a banquet scene similar to that in the Aeneid.

Linguistic use and application
The harpy eagle is a real bird named after the mythological animal.

The term is often used metaphorically to refer to a nasty or annoying woman. In Shakespeare's Much Ado About Nothing, Benedick spots the sharp-tongued Beatrice approaching and exclaims to the prince, Don Pedro, that he would do an assortment of arduous tasks for him "rather than hold three words conference with this harpy!"

Heraldry

The harpy also appears in British heraldry, although it remains a peculiarly German device.

See also
 Alkonost
 Karura
 Kinnara
 Seraphim
 Siren (mythology)
 Sirin
 Tengu
 Tulevieja

Notes

References
 Aeschylus, translated in two volumes. 2. Eumenides by Herbert Weir Smyth, Ph. D. Cambridge, MA. Harvard University Press. 1926. Online version at the Perseus Digital Library. Greek text available from the same website.
 Apollodorus, The Library with an English Translation by Sir James George Frazer, F.B.A., F.R.S. in 2 Volumes, Cambridge, MA, Harvard University Press; London, William Heinemann Ltd. 1921. ISBN 0-674-99135-4. Online version at the Perseus Digital Library. Greek text available from the same website.
 Gaius Julius Hyginus, Fabulae from The Myths of Hyginus translated and edited by Mary Grant. University of Kansas Publications in Humanistic Studies. Online version at the Topos Text Project.
 Gaius Valerius Flaccus, Argonautica translated by Mozley, J H. Loeb Classical Library Volume 286. Cambridge, MA, Harvard University Press; London, William Heinemann Ltd. 1928. Online version at theio.com.
 Gaius Valerius Flaccus, Argonauticon. Otto Kramer. Leipzig. Teubner. 1913. Latin text available at the Perseus Digital Library.
 Hesiod, Theogony from The Homeric Hymns and Homerica with an English Translation by Hugh G. Evelyn-White, Cambridge, MA.,Harvard University Press; London, William Heinemann Ltd. 1914. Online version at the Perseus Digital Library. Greek text available from the same website.
 Homer, The Iliad with an English Translation by A.T. Murray, Ph.D. in two volumes. Cambridge, MA., Harvard University Press; London, William Heinemann, Ltd. 1924. . Online version at the Perseus Digital Library.
 Homer, Homeri Opera in five volumes. Oxford, Oxford University Press. 1920. . Greek text available at the Perseus Digital Library.
 Homer, The Odyssey with an English Translation by A.T. Murray, PH.D. in two volumes. Cambridge, MA., Harvard University Press; London, William Heinemann, Ltd. 1919. . Online version at the Perseus Digital Library. Greek text available from the same website.
 Lucius Annaeus Seneca, Tragedies. Translated by Miller, Frank Justus. Loeb Classical Library Volumes. Cambridge, MA, Harvard University Press; London, William Heinemann Ltd. 1917. Online version at theio.com.
 Lucius Annaeus Seneca, Tragoediae. Rudolf Peiper. Gustav Richter. Leipzig. Teubner. 1921. Latin text available at the Perseus Digital Library.
 Maurus Servius Honoratus, In Vergilii carmina comentarii. Servii Grammatici qui feruntur in Vergilii carmina commentarii; recensuerunt Georgius Thilo et Hermannus Hagen. Georgius Thilo. Leipzig. B. G. Teubner. 1881. Online version at the Perseus Digital Library.
 Nonnus of Panopolis, Dionysiaca translated by William Henry Denham Rouse (1863-1950), from the Loeb Classical Library, Cambridge, MA, Harvard University Press, 1940.  Online version at the Topos Text Project.
 Nonnus of Panopolis, Dionysiaca. 3 Vols. W.H.D. Rouse. Cambridge, MA., Harvard University Press; London, William Heinemann, Ltd. 1940-1942. Greek text available at the Perseus Digital Library.
 Publius Ovidius Naso, Fasti translated by James G. Frazer. Online version at the Topos Text Project.
 Publius Ovidius Naso, Fasti. Sir James George Frazer. London; Cambridge, MA. William Heinemann Ltd.; Harvard University Press. 1933. Latin text available at the Perseus Digital Library.
 Publius Ovidius Naso, Metamorphoses translated by Brookes More (1859-1942). Boston, Cornhill Publishing Co. 1922. Online version at the Perseus Digital Library.
 Publius Ovidius Naso, Metamorphoses. Hugo Magnus. Gotha (Germany). Friedr. Andr. Perthes. 1892. Latin text available at the Perseus Digital Library.
 Publius Vergilius Maro, Aeneid. Theodore C. Williams. trans. Boston. Houghton Mifflin Co. 1910. Online version at the Perseus Digital Library.
 Publius Vergilius Maro, Bucolics, Aeneid, and Georgics. J. B. Greenough. Boston. Ginn & Co. 1900. Latin text available at the Perseus Digital Library.
 Quintus Smyrnaeus, The Fall of Troy translated by Way. A. S. Loeb Classical Library Volume 19. London: William Heinemann, 1913. Online version at theio.com
 Quintus Smyrnaeus, The Fall of Troy. Arthur S. Way. London: William Heinemann; New York: G.P. Putnam's Sons. 1913. Greek text available at the Perseus Digital Library.

External links

 

 
Characters in the Argonautica
Characters in the Odyssey
Deeds of Zeus
Pejorative terms for women
Avian humanoids